Saint Andrew South is a parliamentary constituency represented in the House of Representatives of the Jamaican Parliament. It elects one Member of Parliament MP by the first past the post system of election. It has been represented by Leader of the Opposition Mark Golding since 2017.

Boundaries 

Constituency includes part of Trench Town and Admiral Town.

References

Parliamentary constituencies of Jamaica